St. Jude's Cathedral (formally the Cathedral of St. Simon and St. Jude) is the Anglican cathedral in Iqaluit, Nunavut, Canada. The cathedral is the seat of the Diocese of The Arctic, which covers the Northwest Territories, Nunavut, and the Nunavik region of Northern Quebec. It has the greatest area of any Anglican diocese in the world. The cathedral is also the parish church for the parish of Iqaluit and holds services in English and Inuktitut.

History

The original St. Jude's Cathedral had been designed by Ronald Thom in 1970 and built in 1972 by local volunteers. It was well known for its decorations, most the product of Inuit craftsmanship; these included wall hangings, woven collection baskets, a cross made of narwhal tusks, and a carved soapstone baptismal font dedicated by Elizabeth II, Queen of Canada, during a visit to Iqaluit.

The first St. Jude's Cathedral was demolished in June 2006 after an arson fire in November 2005 destroyed much of the structure.

The current building, informally referred to as the Igloo Cathedral, was opened on June 3, 2012. The unique building, in the shape of an igloo, has traditionally been a landmark and tourist attraction in Iqaluit, besides its important spiritual role for Iqalummiut (people of Iqaluit).

External links

Diocese of The Arctic
Anglican Church of Canada report on the fire

Jude
Anglican church buildings in Nunavut
21st-century Anglican church buildings in Canada
Buildings and structures in Iqaluit
Church buildings with domes
Inuit culture
Destroyed churches in Canada
Religious buildings and structures in Canada destroyed by arson
Churches completed in 1972
Buildings and structures demolished in 2006
Churches completed in 2012
Indigenous architecture of the Americas
20th-century churches in Canada